TV5 Užice is a Serbian television network aired locally to the city of Užice in Western Serbia. It is privately owned and the most watched local network in Užice.

History
TV5 first aired in July 1994. At the time, the Yugoslavia civil war was ranging.  With a democratic change in government, the end of war and oppression against Serbia, the network was able to grow again.

Today TV5 has around 650,000 potential viewers. The most watched programmes are news and current affairs.

Programming
TV5 Užice produces two news bulletins daily, at 7.00PM and 10.00PM. Some other news and current affairs programmes include Info press, Sport 2000, The Hague Tribunal.

The network also airs international shows, documentaries, cartoons and movies. 40% of the air time is dedicated to news and current affairs, 40% to educational programmes and 20% to entertainment programmes.

External links

Television stations in Serbia
Television channels and stations established in 1994
Mass media in Užice